Weetah is a locality and small rural community in the local government area of Meander Valley, in the Launceston region of Tasmania. The 2016 census determined a population of 44 for the state suburb of Weetah.

History
Previously called Tongataboo, the name was changed about 1914 to Weetah, an Aboriginal word meaning "moon".

Road infrastructure
The C710 route (Weetah Road) runs north from the Bass Highway through the locality and then turns west, joining the C711 route (Parkham Road) to return to the Bass Highway at Elizabeth Town.

References

Localities of Meander Valley Council
Towns in Tasmania